Vinter is the Danish, Norwegian and Swedish word for winter. It may also refer to:

Surname
 Aleksander Vinter (born 1987), a Norwegian electronic musician also known as Savant
 Douglas Vinter, an English murderer serving a life sentence without possibility of parole
 Gilbert Vinter (1909–1969), an English conductor and composer
 Julie Vinter Hansen (1890–1960), a Danish astronomer
 Robert Vinter, a Member of the Parliament of England in 1388

Other uses
 Den sidste vinter (The Last Winter), a 1960 Danish war film
 Robinsonekspedisjonen Vinter, the twelfth season of the Norwegian reality show Robinsonekspedisjonen, aired in spring 2012
 Vinter's Theatre, the name used for the Private Opera in Moscow between 1896 and 1899

See also
 Vinters, a surname
 Vinther, a surname
 Vintner (winemaker)
 Winter (disambiguation)